The Falcons were an American rhythm and blues vocal group, some of whose members went on to be influential in soul music.

History
The Falcons formed in 1955 in Detroit, Michigan on the Mercury Records imprint. After personnel changes in 1956, The Falcons had hits for the Lu Pine Records label with the million-selling "You're So Fine" (1959), and "I Found a Love" (1962). The group recorded under the production wing of Robert West, who gave the group a gospel sound and recorded the singers on his own Flick label. "You're So Fine" was a national hit, charting at No. 17, on United Artists' Unart label after being picked up from Flick.

Joe Stubbs was the lead singer, also on the singles "Just for Your Love" (1959) and "The Teacher" (1960), before Wilson Pickett replaced him in 1960. After 1963, the Fabulous Playboys took over the Falcons name. The later group comprised Carlis 'Sonny' Munro, James Gibson, Johnny Alvin, and Alton Hollowell. This group made the R&B chart in 1966, with "Standing on Guard". In 2005, Munro briefly reformed the group with Frank Garcia, Calvin Stephenson and Charnissa Stephenson. 

Singer and songwriter Willie Schofield (born December 30, 1939) died from acute kidney failure at his home in Southfield, Michigan on March 30, 2021, at age 81.

Members
Some members were replaced over time:
 Joe Stubbs (1957–1960)
 Eddie Floyd (1957–1963)
 Wilson Pickett (1960–1963)
 Mack Rice (1957–1963)
 Lance Finney (1957–1963)
 Willie Schofield (1957–1963)
Robert Ward (1957–1963)
 Carlis (Sonny) Munro (1963–2008)           
 Francisco (Frank) Garcia II (2005–2008)      
 Calvin "Dhaak" Stephenson (2005–2008)      
 Charnissa Stephenson (2006–2008)

Discography

Singles

References

External links
 
 The Falcons via soulwalking.com
 Eddie Floyd interview by Pete Lewis, 'Blues & Soul' July 2011

Atlantic Records artists
Chess Records artists
Musical groups from Detroit
American soul musical groups
1955 establishments in Michigan